Walter Eykmann  (born August 20, 1937) is a German politician, representative of the Christian Social Union of Bavaria. He was a member of the Landtag of Bavaria from the 1970s.

See also
List of Bavarian Christian Social Union politicians

References

Christian Social Union in Bavaria politicians
1937 births
Living people
Officers Crosses of the Order of Merit of the Federal Republic of Germany